Mark Levinson may refer to:
Mark Levinson (audio equipment designer) (born 1946), founder of the company
Mark Levinson Audio Systems
Mark Levinson (film director), director of the 2013 documentary Particle Fever
Mark Levinson (film producer), producer of e.g. Russkies and Mystic Pizza